Liam Patrick McCabe Soriano (born 8 July 1999) is an Ecuadorian footballer who plays as a defender or midfielder for Deportivo Cuenca.

Career

Club career

McCabe started his career with Ecuadorian side Deportivo Cuenca after training with St Pat's in the Republic of Ireland. On 19 December 2020, he debuted for Deportivo Cuenca during a 1–2 loss to Guayaquil City.

International career

McCabe is eligible to represent the Republic of Ireland internationally.

References

External links
 

Association football defenders
Association football midfielders
C.D. Cuenca footballers
Ecuadorian footballers
Ecuadorian people of Irish descent
Ecuadorian Serie A players
Living people
1999 births